The J. Homer Smith is a historic house in Yuma, Arizona. It was built in 1917 for J. Homer Smith, a druggist and banker who served as the mayor of Yuma. He later moved to Tucson, and he died in 1936. The house was designed in the American Craftsman architectural style. It has been listed on the National Register of Historic Places since December 7, 1982.

References

American Foursquare architecture
National Register of Historic Places in Yuma County, Arizona
Houses completed in 1917